The Itsy Bitsy Spider is a 1993–1996 American animated fantasy-comedy television series. It was based on the Itsy Bitsy Spider short film produced by Hyperion Animation. It was broadcast on the USA Network's USA Cartoon Express. 26 episodes were produced over two seasons.

Overview
The series revolves around a little girl named Leslie McGroarty who is befriended by a four-eyed spider named Itsy, and two adversaries, the Exterminator and her teacher Adrienne. The series focuses mainly on the Exterminator's futile attempts to rid the world of the arachnid pest his job calls for.

Characters
 Leslie McGroarty (voiced by Francesca Marie Smith) – A cute and playful young city girl with a vivid imagination. Leslie loves things like bicycling, skateboarding, studying karate, bugs, eating candys and something else boyish. She is a tomboy. Leslie has short black hair. She wears circular shaped glasses, a light blue dress with puffed sleeves and a red belt, white socks and black Mary Jane shoes. Leslie had the magical ability to shrink herself to bug size. She is the protagonist of the series.
 Itsy Bitsy (voiced by Frank Welker) – A harmless country spider. He is Leslie's best friend. Itsy Bitsy is also the protagonist of the short film. According to an episode, "Miss Muffet Roughs It", Itsy was a baby with his parents, living in his country life. Frank Welker also voices Adrienne's evil orange cat, Langston.
 Adrienne Van Leydon (voiced by Charlotte Rae) – The main antagonist of the series.
 George (voiced by Jonathan Taylor Thomas) – Leslie's love interest.

Episodes

Season 1
 One Flew Over The Spider's Web
 Itsy Gets Cooking
 Enter The Spider
 Troop Itsy
 Garden Of Itsy
 The Bug Shops Here
 Itsy Ships Out
 Big Top Itsy
 Downhill Itsy
 Itsy Does Hollywood
 Miss Muffet Roughs It
 Nutcracker Cha-Cha-Cha
 Basic Insect

Season 2
 Spider In Spurs
 Itsy's Favorite Haunt
 Code Purple
 Beach Blanket Spider
 Big Time Spider
 Deep Space Spider
 Short Order Spider
 Spider Sense
 It's a Zoo Itsy
 State Fair Itsy
 Spider at Work
 Something Fore Itsy
 Sugar Coated Spider

International broadcasts

References

External links

Itsy Bitsy Spider Cartoon Series
Itsy Bitsy Spider Cartoon Series – Source 2

1993 American television series debuts
1996 American television series endings
USA Network original programming
American children's animated adventure television series
American children's animated comedy television series
American children's animated fantasy television series
Animated television series about children
Television series about spiders
1990s American animated television series
Animated television shows based on films
Television series by CBS Studios
Television series by Hyperion Pictures
=